My Loved One is the debut studio album by Soviet-American singer Lyubov Uspenskaya, released in 1985 in The United States. In Russia the album was published in 1994. 

The record became extremely popular among immigrants and made Lyubov Uspenskaya one of the most popular performers in Brighton Beach. It was certified Platinum by the RIAA.

Track listing 
All songs were sung in the Russian language.

Certifications

References

1985 debut albums
Lyubov Uspenskaya albums
Russian-language albums